"Nights Are Forever" is a song written by composer Jerry Goldsmith and lyricist John Bettis that was produced by James Newton Howard and performed by Jennifer Warnes for the 1983 anthology film Twilight Zone: The Movie. The single became the follow-up to her duet with Joe Cocker, "Up Where We Belong". "Nights Are Forever" is heard very briefly during the jukebox scene in the segment of the film that was written and directed by John Landis and starred Vic Morrow.

Critical reception
"Nights Are Forever" received praise twice from Billboard magazine. In their review of the single, the editors described it as "a simple, light-rock love song that shows off the clear purity of Warnes' voice and the deft production skills of Botnick and Howard." In their review of the soundtrack of Twilight Zone: The Movie, they called it "excellent".

Release and commercial performance
The song began its 4 weeks "bubbling under" the Billboard Hot 100 in the issue dated July 2 of that year and peaked at 105. The July 23 issue marked its first appearance on the magazine's list of the 50 most popular Adult Contemporary songs in the U.S., where it got as high as number 8 over the course of its 16 weeks there.

Personnel
Credits adapted from the liner notes for the original Twilight Zone: The Movie soundtrack album:
Jennifer Warnes – vocals
Bruce Botnick – recorded by, producer
James Newton Howard – arranger, producer
Rik Pekkonen – mixdown engineer
Wendy Waldman – backing vocals
Joseph Williams – backing vocals

Charts

References

Bibliography

External links
Twilight Zone: The Movie, Original Soundtrack at AllMusic

1983 songs
Songs written for films
Jennifer Warnes songs
Songs with lyrics by John Bettis
The Twilight Zone
Songs with music by Jerry Goldsmith